Alias the Doctor is a 1932 pre-Code American drama film directed by Michael Curtiz and starring Richard Barthelmess and Marian Marsh.

Plot
The story concerns a man who assumes his dead brother's identity and becomes a renowned surgeon despite not having completed medical school.

Cast
 Richard Barthelmess as  Karl Brenner 
 Marian Marsh as  Lotti Brenner 
 Norman Foster as  Stephan Brenner 
 Adrienne Dore as  Anna 
 Lucille La Verne as  Martha Brenner, Karl's foster mother (as Lucille LaVerne) 
 Oscar Apfel as  Keller 
 John St. Polis as Dr. Niergardt 
 George Rosener as Dr. Franz von Bergman
 Boris Karloff as a surgeon (scene edited from film by the censors)

Background 
The film's original script involved a playboy medical student who performs an unspecified operation on his girlfriend before earning his medical degree. The girl dies from the botched operation and his foster brother takes the blame. The Hays Office objected because it believed that audiences would assume that the operation was an abortion. In response, Warner Bros. changed the script to provide a specific cause for the operation. In the revised script, the two lovers argue and the girl is injured when she tumbles down the stairs. Originally Boris Karloff played a small role in the film as a surgeon, which was cut from the film by censors, and the Karloff footage no longer exists.

Reception
According to Warner Bros. records, the film earned $460,000 domestically and $181,000 foreign.

References

External links
 
 Alias the Doctor on Turner Classic Movies
 
 

1932 films
1932 drama films
American drama films
American black-and-white films
Films directed by Michael Curtiz
Films set in Austria
Films set in Germany
Warner Bros. films
1930s English-language films
1930s American films
Films scored by Bernhard Kaun
Films about surgeons